Nicolas Hebisch (born 26 March 1990) is a German professional footballer who plays as a forward for Regionalliga Bayern club Viktoria Aschaffenburg.

Career
Hebisch played youth football for several clubs in and around Berlin, before joining SV Babelsberg as a 19-year-old in 2009. In his first season, he helped the club win the Regionalliga Nord, and promotion to the 3. Liga, and made his first appearance at this level in September 2010, as a substitute for Dominik Stroh-Engel in a 2–0 win over Werder Bremen II. After three and a half years and 82 league appearances for the club, Hebisch was released on a free transfer in January 2013. He signed for Berliner AK shortly afterwards, where he spent a successful six months before moving to FSV Zwickau in July 2013. Half a season later he moved on again to TSG Neustrelitz, only to leave the club for fellow Regionalliga Nordost side 1. FC Magdeburg in July 2014. After winning the Regionalliga Nordost and promotion to the 3. Liga, Hebisch found it difficult to get playing time in the new tier and eventually saw his contract run out in June 2016. During the summer break, he joined Regionalliga Südwest side SV Waldhof Mannheim, signing a two-year contract until June 2018.

In July 2018, Hebisch joined FC Viktoria Köln. Hebisch made no appearances for the club due to injuries and joined VfB Lübeck in the following season on a two-year contract.

Hebisch joined Viktoria Aschaffenburg on 1 July 2021, signing a two-year contract with an option for an additional year. He made his debut for the club on 30 July, coming on as a substitute against SpVgg Greuther Fürth II in the Regionalliga Bayern.

References

External links 
 
 

1990 births
Living people
German footballers
Association football forwards
3. Liga players
Regionalliga players
Tennis Borussia Berlin players
SV Babelsberg 03 players
Berliner AK 07 players
FSV Zwickau players
1. FC Magdeburg players
SV Waldhof Mannheim players
FC Viktoria Köln players
VfB Lübeck players
Viktoria Aschaffenburg players
Footballers from Berlin
SC Staaken players